This is a list of Japanese football transfers in the summer transfer window 2018 by club.

J1 League

J2 League

J3 League 

2018
Transfers
Japan

See also
 Football in Japan
Sports in Japan